The Gold Coast Convention and Exhibition Centre (GCCEC) is located on the Gold Coast Highway in Broadbeach, Queensland, Australia. The venue was opened on 29 June 2004 at a cost of A$167 million and is linked by a covered walkway to The Star Gold Coast. Managed by the Star Entertainment Group, the Centre caters for 10 to 6,000 people.

Situated in Broadbeach, the GCCEC is within walking distance to tourism hotspots, five-star accommodation, shopping facilities and public transport.

Expansion

The centre was expanded at a cost of $40 million in early 2009. The makeover was funded by the Queensland Government, adding two extra exhibition halls, a registration office, three meeting rooms, three new kitchens and an extra 3,000 square metres of floor space in total. The Queensland Government commenced construction proceedings as a result of the increasing demand on the Gold Coast for larger space and concurrent sessions during national and international conventions and incentives.

Events

The GCCEC is home to numerous conventions, from the association, corporate and franchise sectors to consumer shows and entertainment events.

From the 2007-08 NBL season until the end of the 2011-12 season, the venue was home to the Gold Coast Blaze of the National Basketball League with the capacity to seat 5,269 spectators. During Blaze home games the centre was referred to as "The Furnace" and gained a reputation for having close games with three Blaze games during the 2010-11 NBL season going into overtime. Along with the Brisbane Convention and Exhibition Centre, the Queensland Firebirds, a Brisbane-based netball team in the Suncorp Super Netball played occasional home games at the venue until 2018.

In 2007 the Professional Bull Riders (PBR) hosted its first-ever World Cup event at the GCCEC, pitting 5 nations of bull riders against each other in a team format; the event was won by team Brazil.

In 2012, GCCEC played host to the Gold Coast judges' audition in the third series of Seven Network's The X Factor and the UFC on FX: Sotiropoulos vs. Pearson bout - the first of its kind to be held in Queensland.

The Centre hosted the Netball competition at the 2018 Commonwealth Games which are being held on the Gold Coast, as well as host the accredited media centre for the event.

On 8 and 9 February 2019 it hosted the Eurovision 2019 Australia Decides contest, the first venue for the contest. The centre once again hosted the contest a year later in 2020.

In December 2019, the Gold Coast Convention Centre was meant to host the first Eurovision Asia Song Contest, however due to production issues the contest had been cancelled.

The venue will host Volleyball for the 2032 Summer Olympics and will also be used for Powerlifting and Sitting Volleyball for the 2032 Summer Paralympics.

Awards
The GCCEC has won more than 20 awards over the past decade, including winner of the 2012 Meetings and Events Industry Awards – National Meeting Venue 500 Delegates or More  and 2010 Meetings and Business Tourism Category at the Qantas Australian Tourism Awards.

Sustainability
The centre's environmental practices have been recognised by the world's largest and most recognised environmental management program, EarthCheck. The centre's environmental and social policy  is driven by a volunteer committee of dedicated employees, who also maintain the centre's annual EarthCheck accreditation program. The centre has successfully implemented an Environmental Management and Sustainability Plan containing key strategies for energy and water conservation and waste management. GCCEC works with community groups including Australia's leading food rescue organisation OzHarvest to redistribute freshly prepared and packaged foods to local charities.

See also

 Sports on the Gold Coast, Queensland

References

External links

Convention centres in Australia
Defunct National Basketball League (Australia) venues
Gold Coast Blaze
Queensland Firebirds
Indoor arenas in Australia
Basketball venues in Australia
Netball venues in Queensland
2018 Commonwealth Games venues
Sports venues on the Gold Coast, Queensland
Boxing venues in Australia
Buildings and structures completed in 2004
2004 establishments in Australia
Sports venues completed in 2004
Broadbeach, Queensland
Star Entertainment Group
Government buildings in Queensland
Music venues in Australia
Venues of the 2032 Summer Olympics and Paralympics
Basketball at the 2018 Commonwealth Games
Netball at the 2018 Commonwealth Games